{{album ratings
| rev1 = AllMusic
| rev1score = 
| rev2 = Robert Christgau
| rev2score = C+
| rev3 = The New York Times
| rev3score = favorable<ref>{{cite news |last=Palmer |first=Robert |date=April 15, 1987 |title=The Pop Life; in Green on Red's New 'Killer,' a Nod to Film Noir |newspaper=The New York Times |url=https://www.nytimes.com/1987/04/15/arts/the-pop-life-in-green-on-red-s-new-killer-a-nod-to-film-noir.html |accessdate=June 2, 2016}}</ref>
| rev4 = Trouser Press| rev4score = favorable
}}The Killer Inside Me'' is the third studio album by American rock band Green on Red, released in 1987 by record labels Mercury and Phonogram.

Track listing
All songs written by Dan Stuart, Chris Cacavas, C.W. Prophet, Jack Waterson.
"Clarkesville" - 4:10
"Mighty Gun" - 4:17
"Jamie" - 3:34
"Whispering Wind" - 1:53
"Ghost Hand" - 2:47
"Sorry Naomi" - 4:25
"No Man's Land" - 4:48
"Track You Down (His Master's Voice)" - 3:21
"Born to Fight" - 3:40 
"We Ain't Free" - 3:21
"Killer Inside of Me" - 5:42

Personnel
Green on Red
Dan Stuart – vocals, guitar
Chris Cacavas – piano, harmonica, electric organ, pump organ, prepared piano
Jack Waterson – bass, double bass
C.W. Prophet - acoustic, electric, 6-string, 12-string and baritone guitar, vocals; string arrangement on "Killer Inside of Me"
Keith Mitchell – drums, percussion
with:
East Memphis Slim – rhythm guitar on "Sorry Naomi"
Mid Town Slick – 12-string guitar on "No Man's Land"
The Brown Brothers, The White Sisters - backing vocals
Technical
Joe Hardy, Mark Ettel - engineer
Ian Dawson - front cover photography

References

External links 
 

1987 albums
Green on Red albums
Albums produced by Jim Dickinson